The Roman Catholic Diocese of Armenia is a diocese located in the city of Armenia in the Ecclesiastical province of Manizales in Colombia.

History
 12 December 1952: Established as Diocese of Armenia from the Diocese of Manizales

Ordinaries
José de Jesús Martinez Vargas (1952.12.18 – 1972.02.08) Retired
Libardo Ramírez Gómez (1972.02.08 – 1986.10.18) Appointed, Bishop of Garzón
José Roberto López Londoño (1987.05.09 – 2003.10.07) Appointed, Bishop of Jericó
Fabio Duque Jaramillo, O.F.M. (2003.11.29 – 2012.06.11) Appointed, Bishop of Garzón
Pablo Emiro Salas Anteliz, (2014.08.18 – 2017.11.14), appointed Archbishop of Barranquilla
Carlos Arturo Quintero Gómez (2018.12.04 - present)

See also
Roman Catholicism in Colombia

Sources

External links
 GCatholic.org

Roman Catholic dioceses in Colombia
Roman Catholic Ecclesiastical Province of Manizales
Christian organizations established in 1952
Roman Catholic dioceses and prelatures established in the 20th century
Armenia, Colombia
1952 establishments in Colombia